The M40 is a short metropolitan route in Johannesburg, South Africa.

Route 
The M40 begins at the M75 and ends at the M52.

References 

Streets and roads of Johannesburg
Metropolitan routes in Johannesburg